Al Mokawloon Al Arab Sporting Club, shortly known as El Mokawloon (The contractors) locally, is an Egyptian sports club based in Nasr City, Cairo, and owned by the prominent constructional engineer Osman Ahmed Osman. The club was founded in 1973 by the Egyptian engineer, contractor, entrepreneur, and politician Osman Ahmed Osman as the official sporting club for his prominent, regional construction company, the Arab Contractors, arguably the biggest one in the entire Middle East at that time. The club is best known for their football team, which currently plays in the Egyptian Premier League, the highest league in the Egyptian football league system.

The club over the years have produced some of the most famous and talented players in Egypt, including Abdel Sattar Sabry, Mohamed Salah, and Mohamed Elneny.

History
The 1983 championship club included Joseph-Antoine Bell (Cameroon), Karim Abdul Razak (Ghana) and Ishmael Dyfan (Sierra Leone).

Honours and achievements

Domestic
Egyptian Premier League: 1983

Egyptian Cup: 1990, 1995, 2004

Egyptian Super Cup: 2004

Continental
African Cup Winners' Cup: 1982, 1983, 1996; runner-up: 1991

CAF Super Cup runner-up: 1997

Performance in CAF competitions
FR = First round
SR = Second round
PO = Play-off round
QF = Quarter-final
SF = Semi-final

Performance in domestic competitions

Current squad
As of 4 February, 2023.

Out on loan

Managers

 Michael Krüger (Jan 1, 1996 – July 1, 1997)
 Josef Hickersberger (July 1, 1997 – June 30, 1999)
 Hassan Shehata (2004–05)
 Ghanem Sultan (2005)
 Mohamed Radwan (2005–06)
 Taha Basry (July 1, 2006 – June 30, 2007)
 Alaa Nabiel (2007–08)
 Mohamed Radwan (May 1, 2008 – May 23, 2009)
 Mohamed Amer (May 23, 2009 – Aug 13, 2010)
 Hamza El Gamal (Aug 13, 2010 – Nov 8, 2010)
 Ivica Todorov (Nov 9, 2010 – April 15, 2011)
 Mohamed Radwan (April 18, 2011 – Jan 20, 2012)
 Talaat Youssef (Jan 2012–1?)
 Mohamed Abdel-Samiea (201?–March 8, 2013)
 Hamdi Nouh (March 8, 2013 – March 17, 2013)
 Mohamed Radwan (March 17, 2013–?)
 Hassan Shehata (2014–15)
 Tarek El-Ashry (2015–16)
 Emad El Nahhas (2018–)

Notes

References

External links

 Official website
 Team profile – kooora.com
 Team profile – footballogue.com

 
Football clubs in Cairo
Association football clubs established in 1973
1973 establishments in Egypt
Multi-sport clubs in Egypt
Works association football clubs in Egypt
African Cup Winners Cup winning clubs